Matías Javier Blázquez Lavín (born May 8, 1991) is a Chilean footballer who plays as a defender for Primera B side Deportes Iquique.

References

External links
 
 BDFA profile 

1991 births
Living people
Sportspeople from Viña del Mar
Chilean footballers
Chilean expatriate footballers
Chile under-20 international footballers
Association football defenders
Chilean Primera División players
Primera B de Chile players
Argentine Primera División players
Everton de Viña del Mar footballers
A.C. Barnechea footballers
Club Atlético Huracán footballers
Deportes Iquique footballers
Santiago Morning footballers
Expatriate footballers in Argentina
Chilean expatriate sportspeople in Argentina